Samad Bounthong (born February 4, 1997) is an American soccer player who plays as a defender.

Career

College
Bounthong played four years of college soccer at Marist College between 2016 and 2019, making 72 appearances, scoring 14 goals and tallying 11 assists.

Professional
Bounthong signed for USL Championship side New York Red Bulls II on March 6, 2020. He made his professional debut the next day, starting in a 1–0 loss against Tampa Bay Rowdies. He was released by Red Bulls II on November 30, 2020.

References

External links
Samad Bounthong at Marist College Athletics

1997 births
Living people
American soccer players
Association football defenders
Marist Red Foxes men's soccer players
New York Red Bulls II players
USL Championship players
Soccer players from Seattle
American people of Laotian descent